Affing is a municipality near Augsburg in Aichach-Friedberg district, in Swabia - Bavaria, southern Germany.

Of the total population of 5,140, 2,591 are male, 2,248 are female, and 301 are of indeterminate status  (Dec 31, 2003). 

Districts (villages) of the municipality Affing: Affing with Iglbach, Anwalting, Aulzhausen, Bergen, Frechholzhausen, Gebenhofen, Haunswies, Katzenthal, Miedering, Mühlhausen, Pfaffenzell.

In May 2015 a tornado devastated Affing, causing severe damage.

Partner city
  Łobez (Poland), since 1997

References

External links 
 Affing (Official site)
  Forced laborer justifies municipality partnership between Affing and Lobez

Aichach-Friedberg